Aleksandr Aleksandrovich Stolyarenko (born 18 January 1991) is a Russian professional footballer. He plays for FC Sokol Saratov.

Career
He made his professional debut in the Russian Second Division in 2007 for FC Krylia Sovetov-SOK Dimitrovgrad.

He made his Russian Football National League debut for FC Torpedo Moscow on 16 March 2012 in a game against FC Mordovia Saransk.

References

External links
 

1991 births
Living people
Russian people of Ukrainian descent
People from Novosibirsk Oblast
Russian footballers
Russia youth international footballers
Association football defenders
Association football midfielders
FC Torpedo Moscow players
FC Sokol Saratov players
PFC CSKA Moscow players
FC Rotor Volgograd players
FC Tyumen players
FC Arsenal Tula players
FC Tambov players
FC Tolyatti players
FC Chayka Peschanokopskoye players
Sportspeople from Novosibirsk Oblast